Marlon Oliveira Araújo (born 28 December 1987) is a Brazilian futsal player who plays as a defender for Palma and the Brazilian national futsal team.

References

External links
Liga Nacional de Futsal profile
Liga Nacional Fútbol Sala profile

1987 births
Living people
Futsal defenders
Brazilian expatriate sportspeople in Spain
Brazilian men's futsal players
Inter FS players